Simmons may refer to:

 Simmons (surname), including a list of people with the surname
Simmons, Kentucky, unincorporated community, United States
Simmons, Missouri, unincorporated community, United States
 Simmons (Red vs. Blue), a fictional character in the animated video series Red vs. Blue
Simmonston, abandoned town site in South Australia, Australia

Business 
 Simmons (electronic drum company), a defunct manufacturer of electronic drum kits
 Simmons & Company International, a private investment bank based in Houston, Texas, United States
 Simmons Bank, a bank based in Arkansas, United States
 Simmons Bedding Company, a bedding manufacturer
 Simmons & Simmons, an international law firm based in London, England, United Kingdom
 Simmons Optics, a subsidiary of Bushnell Corporation producing a line of optical products

Education 
 Simmons College (Massachusetts), a women's liberal arts college in Boston, Massachusetts, United States
 Simmons College of Kentucky, a historically African-American college in Louisville, Kentucky, United States

See also
 Simmonds
 Simonds (disambiguation)
 Simons
 Symonds (disambiguation)